Guillaume Loriot  (born 21 May 1986 in Le Mans) is a French football midfielder. He currently plays for FC Chambly.

References

External links

French footballers
1986 births
Living people
Le Mans FC players
Clermont Foot players
Valenciennes FC players
US Boulogne players
ÉFC Fréjus Saint-Raphaël players
US Orléans players
Ligue 1 players
Ligue 2 players
Championnat National players
Footballers from Le Mans
Association football midfielders